Lonchosternus is a genus of beetles in the family Carabidae, containing the following species:

 Lonchosternus aethiopicus Lecordier, 1991 
 Lonchosternus alluaudi Jeannel, 1949  
 Lonchosternus alutaceus Lecordier, 1991 
 Lonchosternus angolensis (Erichson, 1843)  
 Lonchosternus contractus Lecordier & Girard, 1988 
 Lonchosternus dubius Lecordier & Girard, 1988 
 Lonchosternus girardi Lecordier, 1991 
 Lonchosternus hispanicus Dejean, 1826
 Lonchosternus innominatus Lecordier & Girard, 1988 
 Lonchosternus labrosus Lecordier, 1991 
 Lonchosternus mauritanicus Lucas, 1846
 Lonchosternus mirei Lecordier & Girard, 1988 
 Lonchosternus nitidus Jeannel, 1949 
 Lonchosternus politus (Gory, 1833) 
 Lonchosternus prolixus Lecordier & Girard, 1988 
 Lonchosternus pseudangolensis Lecordier, 1991 
 Lonchosternus robustus Lecordier & Girard, 1988 
 Lonchosternus scrupulosus Lecordier & Girard, 1988 
 Lonchosternus semistriatus (Dejean, 1831) 
 Lonchosternus sublaevis (Reiche, 1849) 
 Lonchosternus substriatus (Chaudoir, 1882) 
 Lonchosternus thoracicus Lecordier, 1991 
 Lonchosternus trapezicollis (Fairmaire, 1903) 
 Lonchosternus valdestriatus Lecordier, 1991

References

Licininae